The Zvartnots Airport clash occurred on 5 July 1988 between Armenian protesters and the Soviet troops at the Zvartnots International Airport at the outskirts of Yerevan.

After the Communist Party of the Soviet Union's conference in late June disapproved the Armenian demands to Nagorno-Karabakh, a new wave of demonstrations erupted in Yerevan. The Soviet government sent troops to Yerevan to "restore order." Thousands of Armenian protesters gathered at the Zvartnots Airport to block the entrance of the Soviet troops. A clash occurred between the troops and the demonstrators. The security forces opened fire killing one person and injuring dozens. The event spread some anti-Soviet sentiment in Armenia.

References

First Nagorno-Karabakh War
1988 in Armenia
1988 in the Soviet Union
Riots and civil disorder in the Soviet Union
Protests in the Soviet Union
Protests in Armenia
July 1988 events in Asia
Riots and civil disorder in Armenia